The Cheatham Lock and Dam is a dam in Ashland City, Tennessee, USA. It was built on the Cumberland River from 1949 to 1951.

References

Buildings and structures in Cheatham County, Tennessee
Dams completed in 1951
Dams in Tennessee
1951 establishments in Tennessee
Dams on the Cumberland River